Yakhak may refer to:
 Yakhak, Afghanistan
 Yakhak, Iran